Tigrioides aurantiaca is a moth in the family Erebidae. It was described by George Hampson in 1918. It is found in the Philippines.

References

Moths described in 1918
Lithosiina